Takahashi Shōtei (高橋松亭), born Hiroaki (1871 – 11 February 1945) was a 20th-century Japanese woodblock artist in the shin-hanga art movement.

Biography 
Hiroaki Takahashi was born in Tokyo, Japan, in 1871. As a young artist he was given the artistic name Shotei by his uncle, Matsumoto Fuko, under whose tutelage he was apprenticing. When he was 16 years old, he started a job with the Imperial Household Department of Foreign Affairs, where he copied the designs of foreign ceremonial objects. As with many Japanese woodblock artists over his lifetime he signed his work with various names and worked for several publishing companies. After studying art, Shotei and Terazaki Kogyo founded the Japan Youth Painting Society in 1889. In 1907, as a successful artist, he was recruited by Shōzaburō Watanabe to contribute to the Shin Hanga ("New Prints") art movement in Japan.  Watanabe helped to fulfill the Western demand for Ukiyoe woodblock prints which would be similar to familiar historical masters of that genre, including Hiroshige. In about 1921 Shotei added the artistic name of Hiroaki. In 1923 the Great Kanto earthquake (and subsequent fire) destroyed Watanabe's facilities; this included all Shin Hanga woodblocks. Thus, Shotei recreated prior designs destroyed in the Great Kanto earthquake and also continued to produce new woodblocks. Shotei died of pneumonia on February 11, 1945. There is a persistent rumor that he died in the atomic bombing of Hiroshima but this is incorrect. 

His works are held in the permanent collections of many museums worldwide, including the British Museum, the Princeton University Art Museum, the Museum of Fine Arts Boston, the University of Michigan Museum of Art, the National Museum of Asian Art, the Los Angeles County Museum of Art, the Arizona State University Art Museum, the Brunnier Art Museum, the Honolulu Museum of Art, and the Saint Louis Art Museum.

See also 
 Hasui Kawase

References

Further reading
Smith, Lawrence. The Japanese Print Since 1900, Harper & Row Publishers Inc., New York 1983,  
Smith, Lawrence. Modern Japanese Prints 1912–1989. New York, London, Paris: Cross River Press, 1994. 
Till, Barry. The New Print Movement in Japan. Pomegranate Communications, Reprint 2007,

External links

Shotei's Cats
  MFA.org Museum of Fine Arts - Boston, MA, Search on Shotei
 Shotei.com Continuing analysis of Shotei's Catalogue with emphasis on pre and post Great Kanto Earthquake versions.
Shin hanga — Viewing Japanese Prints, by John Fiorillo
Hiroaki Takahashi Shotei's Cats
Shotei's works in the collection of the National Gallery of Art

Japanese printmakers
1871 births
1945 deaths
Shin hanga artists
Artists from Tokyo
19th-century Japanese artists
20th-century Japanese artists
19th-century printmakers
20th-century printmakers